Fra Gregorio Carafa (17 March 1615 – 21 July 1690) was a nobleman from the House of Carafa and the 61st  Grand Master of the Order of Saint John, from 1680 to his death in 1690.

Early life
Carafa was born on 17 March 1615 in Castelvetere (modern Caulonia) in Calabria, Italy  to Girolamo, Prince of Roccella and Diana Vittori, the niece of Pope Paul IV (Pope Paul V?). His brother was the Cardinal Carlo Carafa della Spina.

He was enlisted with the Order of Saint John when he was aged only three months, in June 1615. He studied in Naples, and various dignitaries and knights of the Order contributed to his education. In 1635 he went to Catalonia with his uncle Francesco Carafa, the Prior general of Roccella. Carafa was soon promoted to Knight Grand Cross of the Order, and was promoted to Prior general of Rocella after his uncle died.

In 1647, he was involved in the Masaniello revolt in which he tried to restore peace and order in Naples. After the defeat of the rebels in Naples, he was sent to Calabria to quell the uprising there. These events led to him being promoted and he was given command of the Order's fleet.

In 1656, he commanded the 7 Maltese galleys at the Battle of the Dardanelles. In this battle, the joint Venetian-Maltese fleet was victorious, and as a reward, Malta received 11 captured Ottoman ships. This battle was heaviest naval defeat for the Ottomans since the Battle of Lepanto.

After the victorious battle he was welcomed in Malta as a hero. Subsequently he reclaimed the wetlands at Bormola and strengthened the Order's fleet.

Magistracy
In 1682, he was elected Grand Master of the Order after the death of Nicolas Cotoner. In the same year that he became Grand Master, Carafa paid for the renovation of Auberge d'Italie. The facade was rebuilt in Baroque style, and a bronze bust of Carafa was placed in a prominent position over the front door of the Auberge. His personal coat of arms was also sculpted close to the bust.

From 1681 onwards, Fort Saint Angelo was strengthened and rebuilt by the architect Carlos de Grunenbergh, at Carafa's request. Carafa's name appears on the plaque above the fort's main gate.

During his reign, the Order's navy was at its peak, with galleys led by knights and manned by experienced crews. Fearing an Ottoman attack, in 1687 Carafa strengthened Fort Saint Elmo by building a series of fortifications known as the Carafa Enceinte on the foreshore surrounding the fortress.

Playing Cards was introduced in Malta during his reign.

Carafa died on 21 July 1690 and was succeeded by Adrien de Wignacourt. He is buried in the Chapel of the Langue of Italy of St. John's Co-Cathedral in Valletta, Malta.

References

Further reading
 Sirago, Maria.  Gregorio Carafa: Gran Maestro dell'Ordine di Malta. Taranto: Centro studi melitensi, 2001.

External links
 Coins of Grandmaster Gregorio Carafa

1615 births
1690 deaths
Gregorio
Grand Masters of the Knights Hospitaller
Italian knights
17th-century Italian nobility
Knights of Malta
Burials at Saint John's Co-Cathedral
People of the Ottoman–Venetian Wars
Cretan War (1645–1669)
17th-century Italian military personnel